This is a summary of 1949 in music in the United Kingdom.

Events
February – On hearing of the death of Ernest Walker, Albert Schweitzer writes: "Now the dear, gentle, kind, distinguished Dr. Walker has left this life. Seeing him impressed me deeply each time."
14 July – Kathleen Ferrier performs in the world premiere of Benjamin Britten's Spring Symphony in Amsterdam, with Eduard van Beinum and the Concertgebouw Orchestra, a work written specifically for her.
5 September – Wagnerian tenor Walter Widdop makes his last appearance at The Proms, singing an aria from Lohengrin, only one day before his sudden death.
date unknown – The Tempo Records jazz record label is founded by Colin Pomroy, Jack Clough, and R.E.G. (Ron) Davies.

Popular music
"Snowy White Snow and Jingle Bells" by Billy Reid, performed by Dorothy Squires
The Wedding of Lili Marlene" by Tommie Connor

Classical music: new works
Malcolm Arnold – Symphony No. 1
Havergal Brian – Symphony No. 8 in B flat Minor
Benjamin Britten – Spring Symphony
William Walton – Sonata for violin and piano (written for Yehudi Menuhin and Louis Kentner)

Opera
Benjamin Britten – Let's Make an Opera (The Little Sweep)
Ralph Vaughan Williams – The Pilgrim's Progress (original version)

Film and Incidental music
Richard Addinsell – The Passionate Friends directed by David Lean.
Arthur Bliss – Christopher Columbus, starring Fredric March.
Ernest Irving – Kind Hearts and Coronets, starring Alec Guinness.A Run for Your Money, starring Donald Houston and Meredith Edwards.Whisky Galore! directed by Alexander Mackendrick, starring Basil Radford, Bruce Seton, Joan Greenwood and Gordon Jackson.

Musical theatre
22 June – Her Excellency starring Cicely Courtneidge opens at the London Hippodrome
15 September – King's Rhapsody, with music by Ivor Novello and lyrics by Christopher Hassall, opens at the Palace Theatre, London.

Musical filmsMaytime in Mayfair, starring Anna NeagleMelody in the Dark, starring Eunice GaysonTrottie True, starring Jean Kent and Hugh Sinclair

Births
4 January – Margaret Anne Marshall, Scottish soprano
19 January – Robert Palmer, singer (died 2003)
22 January – Phil Miller, English guitarist 
6 February – Mike Batt, singer and composer
7 February – Alan Lancaster, bass player (Status Quo and The Party Boys)
16 February – Lyn Paul, English singer and actress (The New Seekers)
26 February – Dame Emma Kirkby, soprano
24 March – Nick Lowe, singer-songwriter
11 April – Lee Sheriden, singer with Brotherhood of Man
13 May – Jane Glover, conductor
18 May – Rick Wakeman, multi-instrumentalist and composer
21 May – Rosalind Plowright, operatic mezzo-soprano
14 June – Alan White, rock drummer (Yes) (died 2022)
17 June – Snakefinger, English singer-songwriter and guitarist (The Residents and Chilli Willi and the Red Hot Peppers) (died 1987)
24 June – John Illsley, singer-songwriter, bass player, and producer (Dire Straits)
3 July – John Verity, guitarist (Argent)
12 July – John Wetton, bass guitarist (King Crimson, Roxy Music)
15 July – Trevor Horn, record producer, songwriter, musician and singer, sometimes called "The Man Who Invented the Eighties".
17 July 
Geezer Butler, bass player and songwriter (Black Sabbath, Geezer Butler Band, GZR, and Heaven & Hell)
Wayne Sleep, actor, dancer, and choreographer
28 July – Simon Kirke, English drummer (Bad Company and Free)
12 August 
Mark Knopfler, singer, songwriter, guitarist and composer
Lou Martin, Irish-English pianist, songwriter, and producer (died 2012)
28 August – Hugh Cornwell (The Stranglers)
1 October – Allan Barty, folk musician (died 2008)
29 October – David Paton, guitarist, singer and songwriter
2 November – Frankie Miller, rock singer-songwriter
23 November – Sandra Stevens, singer with Brotherhood of Man
26 November – Martin Lee, singer with Brotherhood of Man
3 December – Nicky Stevens, singer with Brotherhood of Man
5 December – John Altman, film composer, arranger and conductor
8 December – Ray Shulman, violinist, guitarist, and producer 
17 December – Paul Rodgers, rock vocalist
22 December – Robin Gibb (died 2012) and Maurice Gibb (died 2003) (Bee Gees

Deaths
11 January – Edward Goll, Bohemian-born pianist, 64
15 January – Robert Evett, singer, actor, theatre manager and producer, 74
21 February – Ernest Walker, composer, pianist, organist, teacher and writer on music, 78
3 April – Basil Harwood, organist and composer, 89
3 May – David John Tawe Jones, composer, 64
6 September – Walter Widdop, operatic tenor, 51
30 October – Stanley Kirkby, baritone singer and variety artist, 71date unknown'' – Frank Clifford Harris, lyricist, 74

See also
 1949 in British television
 1949 in the United Kingdom
 List of British films of 1949

References

 
British Music, 1949 In
British music by year